"Shooting Stars" is a song by Australian electronic duo Bag Raiders. The song was originally featured on the band's EP, Turbo Love, in 2008. The year afterwards, the song was released as a single from their eponymous debut album Bag Raiders, and reached number 18 in the Triple J Hottest 100 countdown of 2009. Although the song was released and charted in Australia in 2009, the song did not reach its peak there until 2013. It received international attention in February 2017 when the song became a part of a popular internet meme, thus cementing the track's legacy as a sleeper hit. The song reached number 11 on Billboard's Dance/Electronic Songs chart and number 9 on the Billboard Bubbling Under chart that year. The vocals on the song are performed by Rhys Taylor.

In 2015, the song was listed at number 29 in In the Mix's '100 Greatest Australian Dance Tracks of All Time' with Dave Ruby Howe saying "[it] was a bright, euphoric tonic ... with an instantly-classic chorus".

History
In an interview with The Sydney Morning Herald, Jack Glass, a member of the band, said that the single inspired him to create their self-titled album, claiming that "people loved Shooting Stars so much and we liked that direction of songwriting and developing a pop sensibility ourselves, too." Glass also said that the band also played half of the song in clubs before the band had realized that "people liked it and wanted to hear the whole thing."

Composition
The song is composed in G minor and a tempo of 125 BPM. It also contains the interesting oddity of a melody played on the Stylophone, which is one of only a few examples of the Stylophone's use in professional music composition. The song's chorus is only played at the end of the song. The bass player is switched between the two band members in the verse and chorus.

Reception
"Shooting Stars" was well received by music critics. Andrew Murfett of The Sydney Morning Herald described the song as "peppy track" and compared the song to works of Daft Punk.

Revival 
In 2013, "Shooting Stars" was used on Australia's Got Talent by contestant Tommy Franklin, which led to the song entering the top 40 of the ARIA Singles Chart nearly four years after it was originally released due to downloads.

After the death of Harambe the gorilla in May 2016, an animated tribute featuring the song, using clips from Ego's music video for "The Crazy Things We Do", spread on the internet. In 2017, the song received greater international attention when the song became a part of a popular internet meme. The video that boosted the popularity of the meme was an upload on Reddit titled "Fat man does amazing dive". In the meme, the song is usually accompanied with people falling with surreal, spacey backgrounds. Chris Stracey, a member of the band, reacted to the meme, saying "At first we were like, ok this is funny I guess, but I didn't really get it so I thought "alright whatever". Once I started seeing a common theme though, such as the big guy jumping off the bridge into the river, that was the first one of the more recent stuff that really got me. So good! That and the Lady Gaga one is so funny [referring to a mashup with Gaga’s performance during the Super Bowl LI halftime]."

The song and its corresponding meme was later featured in the music video for the Katy Perry song "Swish Swish".

New York Magazine referred to the meme as the "first big post-Vine meme." Meanwhile, Daily Dot compared the meme to Neil Cicierega's 2010 viral video, Brodyquest.

On 6 December 2017, Shooting Stars (along with the popular meme associated within the song) is featured in YouTube Rewind: The Shape of 2017.

The official music video on YouTube has over 140.2 million views as of November 2022.

Track listings 
12" maxi
"Shooting Stars" – 3:55
"Shooting Stars" (Siriusmo Remix) – 5:30
"Shooting Stars" (Kris Menace Remix) – 7:29
"Shooting Stars" (In Flagranti Remix) – 6:38

Covers 
The song was first covered by Hidden Cat in 2009. The song was later covered by American progressive house producer Elephante in 2014. In 2020, Australian producer POOLCLVB and singer MARSHES officially released a cover of the song, although this cover was first uploaded to YouTube in 2015.

In November 2022, Australian DJ, Flume and American singer, Toro y Moi covered the song for Triple J.

Charts

Weekly charts

Year-end charts

Certifications

Appearances in other media
The song was featured during the end credits of Season 1, Episode 6 of the 2010 HBO series How to Make It in America. In 2011, Madeon featured the song in his mashup, "Pop Culture". The song was also featured on the soundtrack to NBA 2K16, in the playlist "Around the World".

References

2009 singles
2009 songs
Bag Raiders songs
Internet memes introduced in 2017